Béla Sebestyén (23 January 1886 – 19 December 1959) was a Hungarian international footballer who played as a winger. Sebestyén was Jewish. He played club football for MTK. He also represented his country at international level, earning 24 caps between 1906 and 1912, and appearing at the 1912 Summer Olympics. He later coached MTK.

See also
List of Jewish footballers

References

External links
 
Jews In Sports

1886 births
1959 deaths
Hungarian footballers
Hungary international footballers
Jewish footballers
Association football midfielders
Hungarian Jews
Footballers from Budapest
MTK Budapest FC players
Hungarian football managers
Olympic footballers of Hungary
Footballers at the 1912 Summer Olympics